The London, Midland and Scottish Railway (LMS) Sentinel No. 7192 was a geared steam locomotive.  It was built in 1934 by the Sentinel Waggon Works of Shrewsbury, maker's number 8805 on LMS Lot 111.  It had an Abner Doble boiler combined with a 4-cylinder compound arrangement, but an order for an additional locomotive and three railcars to a similar was later cancelled.  It was withdrawn in 1963 and scrapped.

References

0F
0-4-0T locomotives
Sentinel locomotives
Compound locomotives
Railway locomotives introduced in 1934
Standard gauge steam locomotives of Great Britain
Scrapped locomotives

Individual locomotives of Great Britain 
Shunting locomotives